Ajahn Sao Kantasilo (1859–1942) was a monk in the Thai Forest Tradition of Theravada Buddhism.  He was a member of the Dhammayuttika Nikaya.

Ajahn Sao was ordained as a monk at the age of 20, entering the Maha Nikaya order. In 1887 he re-ordained in the Dhammayut order. Both ordinations were in Ubon Ratchathani Province.

Ajahn Mun Bhuridatta Mahathera was one of his most well-known students. The two were known to often travel together, wandering throughout the forests of Thailand in the “tudong” tradition of monks who leave behind the more sedentary monastery life and take up many (if not all) of the thirteen dhutanga austerities or ascetic practices allowed by the Buddha in the Pali Canon.

Ajahn Sao was greatly influenced, in his own practice and in teaching his disciples, by the methods advocated by Somdet Phra Vanarat Buddhasiri (1806-1891), one of the founders of the Dhammayut order. The latter’s teachings are found summarized in his treatise “Caturarakka Kammathana,” or “The Four Objects of Meditation That Give Protection.”

As a teacher, Ajahn Sao urged his disciples to be diligent, systematic and consistent. He taught them to wake at 3 a.m. and to practice sitting or walking meditation until 10 p.m.

He died on 3 February 1942 at the age of 82 at a monastery in Champasak Province while prostrating in front of the main Buddha image in the Uposatha hall, "with full mindfulness and plenitude".

After his cremation, his bone fragments were distributed to people around the Thai provinces.  According to his followers, they transformed into crystal-like relics (Pali: Sarira-Dhatu) in various hues.

References

Thai Forest Tradition monks
Thai Theravada Buddhist monks
1861 births
1941 deaths
People from Ubon Ratchathani province